Mercury KX (MKX) is a British, London-based modern classical, electronic, and avant-garde music record label that was founded in 2016. Artists signed to the label have included Ólafur Arnalds, Anoushka Shankar, Guy Sigsworth, Jonny Greenwood, Keaton Henson, Luke Howard, Sebastian Plano, and Lambert.

History 

Founded in 2016 and affiliated with London-based Decca Records, it is part of Universal Music Group.

Artists

See also 
 List of record labels
 Decca Studios, London, England
 Universal Music Group

References

External links 
 
 Shop Mercury KX on Decca Records
 Decca Records Group launches new label Mercury KX (Music Weekly)
 Universal Launches Post Classical Label (Music Business Worldwide)
 

Record labels established in 2016
Classical music record labels
Ambient music record labels
Record labels based in London
Electronic music record labels